The 1984 NCAA Division I-AA Football Championship Game was a postseason college football game between the Montana State Bobcats and the Louisiana Tech Bulldogs. The game was played on December 15, 1984, at Johnson Hagood Stadium in Charleston, South Carolina. The culminating game of the 1984 NCAA Division I-AA football season, it was won by Montana State, 19–6.

The championship game was televised on the Satellite Program Network (SPN), as the NCAA paid SPN to broadcast some playoff contests following a Supreme Court ruling (NCAA v. Board of Regents of the University of Oklahoma) that halted the NCAA's practice of negotiating television contracts for its members.

Teams
The participants of the Championship Game were the finalists of the 1984 I-AA Playoffs, which began with a 12-team bracket.

Montana State Bobcats

Montana State finished their regular season with a 9–2 record (6–1 in conference); two wins came over Division II opponents (Mesa State and Portland State) and one win came over a Division I-A program (Fresno State). Tied for second in the final NCAA I-AA in-house poll and seeded third in the tournament, the Bobcats received a first-round bye then defeated Arkansas State and second-seed Rhode Island to reach the final. This was the first appearance for Montana State in a Division I-AA championship game.

Louisiana Tech Bulldogs

Louisiana Tech finished their regular season with a 7–4 record (5–1 in conference); three of their losses were to Division I-A programs (Southwestern Louisiana, Southern Miss, and Ole Miss). Ranked ninth in the final NCAA I-AA in-house poll and unseeded in the tournament, the Bulldogs defeated Mississippi Valley State, top-seed Alcorn State, and Middle Tennessee State to reach the final. This was also the first appearance for Louisiana Tech in a Division I-AA championship game.

Game summary

Scoring summary

Game statistics

References

Further reading

External links
 1984 I-AA National Championship via YouTube

Championship Game
NCAA Division I Football Championship Games
Louisiana Tech Bulldogs football games
Montana State Bobcats football games
American football in South Carolina
Sports in Charleston, South Carolina
NCAA Division I-AA Football Championship Game
NCAA Division I-AA Football Championship Game
Sports competitions in South Carolina
Events in Charleston, South Carolina